Sarah Unsicker (born May 3, 1976) is an American politician who has served in the Missouri House of Representatives first elected from the 91st district in 2016, and after redistricting in 2022, from district 83.

Electoral history
 Rep. Unsicker did not face any opponents in the Democratic Primary elections any of the four times she was elected to the House.

References

1976 births
Living people
Democratic Party members of the Missouri House of Representatives
21st-century American politicians
Women state legislators in Missouri
21st-century American women politicians